Dolly Bhatta (born 11 January 2002, Kanchanpur, Nepal) is a Nepalese cricketer who plays for Nepal women's national cricket team.

Playing career 
She was named in Nepal women's national cricket team squads for 2019 Thailand Women's T20 Smash. On 12 January 2019, She made her Twenty20 International debut against China women's in the Thailand Women's T20 Smash. In February 2019, she was also named in Nepal's women squads for the tournament 2019 ICC Women's Qualifier Asia in Bangkok, Thailand.

In October 2021, she was named in Nepal's side for the 2021 ICC Women's T20 World Cup Asia Qualifier tournament in the United Arab Emirates.

References

External links 
 

2002 births
Living people
Nepalese women cricketers
Nepal women Twenty20 International cricketers
People from Kanchanpur District
South Asian Games bronze medalists for Nepal
South Asian Games medalists in cricket